Manau may refer to:

Manau (group), a hip-hop band
Manau, Nepal
Rattan, a plant, from the Malay rotan manau
Manau (dance), a Kachin dance
Manau Gododdin or Manaw Gododdin, an area of what is now Scotland in the Early Middle Ages
Mânău, a village in Ulmeni, Maramureș, Romania